The Right of the Strongest is a 1924 American silent drama film directed by Edgar Lewis and starring E.K. Lincoln, Helen Ferguson, and George Siegmann. It was adapted from a 1913 novel of the same name by Frances Nimmo Greene.

Plot
As described in a film magazine review, John Marshall, young engineer, goes to Bullis Valley in the Alabama hills to secure lands for a big power project. The hill folks  hink he is a revenue spy and plans are laid against his life. He is in love with a school teacher, Mary Dale. Her father was previously slain by the hill squatters when they suspected him of plying the trade of government informant. She struggles through a storm to reach his cabin to warn him. A lynching party, headed by Trav Williams arrives. Williams and Marshall agree to fight it out and battle furiously. Marshall's men from the construction camp rush to their chief's rescue. He weds Mary.

Cast

Preservation
With no prints of The Right of the Strongest located in any film archives, it is a lost film.

References

Bibliography
 Rainey, Buck. Sweethearts of the Sage: Biographies and Filmographies of 258 Actresses Appearing in Western Movies. McFarland & Company, 1992.

External links

1924 films
1924 drama films
1920s English-language films
American silent feature films
Silent American drama films
American black-and-white films
Films directed by Edgar Lewis
Selznick Pictures films
1920s American films